Paulo Agenor do Rio Branco da Silva Paranhos (Paris, July 10, 1876 – Paris, February 17, 1927) was a French-born Brazilian rugby union player. He was the son of the Baron of Rio Branco and Marie Philomène Stevens (dancer of Belgian origin).

He studied Medicine in Paris, where he settled, becoming a surgeon. He was the first Brazilian rugby union player of international level, and became a celebrity in France. He first played as a hooker, but later moved to fullback.

Rio Branco was one of the best players for the legendary French team of Stade Français, winning six titles of National Champion, in 1893, 1894, 1895, 1897, 1898 and 1901. He was also twice vice champion, in 1896 and 1899. A dual French and Brazilian citizen, he played for France in unofficial matches.

He served as a volunteer at World War I, as a civilian physician for the French-Brazilian hospital, depending from the Red Cross. He became a knight of the Legion of Honour for his services during wartime.

References

External links
Paulo do Rio Branco Player Statistics

1876 births
1927 deaths
Brazilian emigrants to France
French people of Belgian descent
French rugby union players
Brazilian rugby union players
French surgeons
Brazilian surgeons
Rugby union hookers
Rugby union fullbacks
Physicians from Paris
Brazilian people of Belgian descent
Stade Français players